Oegoconia deluccai is a moth of the family Autostichidae. It is found on Malta and Gozo, which is part of Malta.

References

Moths described in 1952
Oegoconia